One for the Money is the sixteenth studio album by American country music artist T. G. Sheppard. It was released in 1987 via Columbia Records. The albums includes the single "One for the Money".

Track listing

Chart performance

References

1987 albums
T. G. Sheppard albums
Columbia Records albums